Éxitos de Gloria Estefan is the first compilation album released by American recording artist Gloria Estefan, but is the second solo release and the 13th overall, released in 1990 (see 1990 in music).  In 1999, the CD was re-released in the US as 20th Anniversary.

Content
In 1990, after the entire success gained with the smash album Cuts Both Ways, Gloria released her first compilation album, but this was of all the Spanish greatest hits, with the exception of "Conga" and "Dr. Beat" being the only songs in English.

Before Eyes of Innocence, the Miami Sound Machine had recorded 7 albums in Spanish, so here she released some songs from those albums, and included "Conga" and "Dr. Beat", which are in English, as well as Spanish adaptations of some of her hits from the 80's.  The compilation also includes "Toda pra você" (roughly translates as "completely yours"), the Portuguese version of the song "Here We Are."

Track listing
Some LP Releases did include the Bonus Track

Chart positions
This compilation reached No. 1 on the Top Latin Pop Albums chart. However, on the comprehensive albums chart in US, the Top Latin Albums chart, the album reached No. 32. The album is not known to have charted in any other country.

Certification

Release history

See also
List of number-one Billboard Latin Pop Albums from the 1990s

References
 
 

1990 greatest hits albums
Gloria Estefan compilation albums
Albums produced by Emilio Estefan
Epic Records compilation albums